Virus are an English punk rock band formed in 1983 which promotes and supports anarchism, vegetarianism, anti nuclear and environmental issues.

History 
Virus originally formed in the summer of 1983 in Gillingham, Dorset. The band's line up Des, vocals, Bowzer, guitar, Jaz, bass and Rich, drums, recorded their first demo, Infected in early 1984. Shortly after Des left the band and was replaced by Dave, the new line recorded and released You Can’t Ignore It Forever in December 1984. In 1985 Des rejoined Virus to create a five piece supported Subhumans, Anthrax, Organised Chaos, Disorder, The Varukers, Conflict, Liberty, Culture Shock and Zounds. Virus contributed a track to the Mortarhate compilation album, We Won’t Be Your Fucking Poor before splitting in the summer of 1986.

In 1996 Virus reformed with Charlie Barber on drums for a one-off gig. The reformation was an attempt to rekindle interest in the band but logistically it was difficult as Jaz lived in Reading and Bowzer in France. The audience reaction was also not particularly favourable so this reformation was short-lived.

After Ian Glasper included Virus in, The Day The Country Died original members, Dave and Jaz, started the band again with a new guitarist, Rich Hoskins and drummer, Mark Smith. This line up stayed together until 2013 and released two studio albums, Unacceptable Noise Levels (2007), Virulence (2011) and 7 inch single, It’s Not What It Appears (2013). In 2013 Mark left Virus and was replaced by Sam Kenyon. The next Virus line up released the 7 inch single Illuminati through their own record label Subversive Haircuts as well as playing on a split record with Bug Central and The System released through Grow Your Own Records. Shortly after Rich left the band and Virus had some temporary guitarists until 2015 when Tom Weeks joined. In 2016 Virus took part in the Hunt Saboteurs Association Benefit series and 2017 releasing their latest single, One Minute’s Silence & Infidel.

Discography 
Albums
 Infected (1984)
 You Can't Ignore If Forever (1984)
 Unacceptable Noise Levels (2007)
 Virulence (2011)
 Pathogens (2019)
 Introvert Extravert (2022)

Live Albums
 Live At Henrys Cafe (1985)
Singles
 It's Not What It Appears (2013)
 Illuminati / Vanity (2015)
 Drunk Lover / Demonic (Benefit for the Hunt Saboteurs Association, 2016)
 One Minute's Silence (Grow Your Own Records, 2017)
Compilations
 Futile - Split EP with The System and Bug Central (2015)
 The Turkey - We Won't Be Your Fucking Poor (Mortarhate, 1985)
 Futile - Birds Of A Feather (2016, Grow Your Own)
 Nuclear? No Thanks - Straight Out Of Somerset (The Outsider, 2016)

Band members
Current members

 Jaz Wiseman - 1983 to Present
 Sam Kenyon - 2013 to Present
 Tom Weeks - 2015 to Present
Former members
  Des Hoskins - 1983 to 1986
 Rich Broklehurst - 1983 - 1986
 Marcus ‘Bowzer’ Bowering 1983 to 1986 & 1996
 Shane Whitehead - 1984 - 1985
 Charlie Barber - 1996
 Mark Smith - 2006 to 2013
 Rich Hoskins 2006 to 2013
Dave Oliver 1984 to 2018

References

English punk rock groups